The following highways are numbered 752:

Costa Rica
 National Route 752

United States